A leadership election was held by the United Malays National Organisation (UMNO) party on 30 June 2018.

Background
The election was initially scheduled to be held in 2019. However, Barisan Nasional lost the election in 2018 Malaysian general election for the first time since independence. Then-President Najib Razak stood down and was replaced by acting President Ahmad Zahid Hamidi.

The nomination process started on 1 June 2018. The registration will close on 17 June 2018 at 5 pm.

Debate

The Presidential election was held on 29 June 2018. It was telecast on Astro Awani at 9.30 pm. It featured the three prominent candidates, which are Ahmad Zahid Hamidi, Tengku Razaleigh Hamzah and Khairy Jamaluddin.

Supreme Council election results

The result will mostly out on 1.00 am on 1 July 2018.

Permanent Chairman

Deputy Permanent Chairman

President

Deputy President

Vice Presidents

Supreme Council Members

See also
2018 Malaysian general election
Second Najib cabinet
2023 United Malays National Organisation leadership election

References

2018 elections in Malaysia
United Malays National Organisation leadership election
United Malays National Organisation leadership elections